Sehr Bagla (سہر بگلہ) is a Village and Union Council of Murree Tehsil in the Murree District of Punjab, Pakistan. It is located in the north-east of the Tehsil and is bounded to the north by Potha Sharif, to the south by Ghel, to the west by Rawat and to the east by Kashmir

According to the 1998 census of Pakistan, it had a population of 10,979.

Schools and education
There are 18 primary schools and 3 secondary schools in UC Sehr Bagla, some are listed below:

Hira Secondary School
Hira Public School Gohi Birgran
Suffah School of Islamic Studies
GHS Riaz Model High
GGPS Primary Hoterian
GGPS Neargoli
GBPS Sehr
GBPS Reunty
GBPS Birgran
GBPS Gohi

Facilities
Sehr Bagla is home to predominantly poor inhabitants, the area is economically deprived due to lack of government investment and infrastructure development, basic essentials i.e. clean water supply, gas, safe roads and higher education have not been established, due to this most of the inhabitants are economically disadvantaged and many have had to move to the nearby cities of Islamabad and Rawalpindi to pursue better opportunities.There are some basic services and facilities available:

Basic Health Unit
Forest Office
Post Office
PCO Public Call Office
Jeep Hire
Fruit Market & Grocery Stores, Butcher, Bakery, Tandoor(Clay Oven)
Gas Cylinder Re-fill Facility
Jamia Mosque
Volleyball Court
Restaurant & Cafe

Mosques
There are numerous Mosques in UC Sehr Bagla, most villages within the UC have constructed local mosques, some of the more prominent Mosques are listed below,

Jamia Masjid (Sehr Bagla Bazaar)
Munawwar Masjid (Mid Sehr Bagla)
Allah Wali Masjid (Upper Sehr Bagla)
Jamia Masjid Neargoli
Jamia Masjid Kasseri
Masjid Reunty
Jamia Masjid Birgran (3 Mosques)
Jamia Masjid Gohi

Tribes
As with the majority of the Murree Hills the main tribe settled in Sehr Bagla are the Dhund Abbasi, there are also members of the Kethwal and Dhanyal tribes settled in the area.

The northern half of the Murree Tehsil is held entirely by the Dhund, who claim to be Abbasi Arabs, claiming descent from Muhammad's uncle Abbas ibn Abdul Mutalib. The Satti tribe, which claims Rajput ancestry is found confined to the hilly Kotli Sattian Tehsil. In between these two tribes, are wedged the Kethwal, who claim descent from the Greek general Alexander the Great. The Dhanyal hold the western half of the Murree Tehsil, known as the Karor illaqa, as well as villages in the Islamabad Capital Territory. Like the Awan, the Dhanyal claim descent from the Prophet Mohammed's son in-law Ali. The smallest of the Murree Hill tribes are the Jasgam, who hold several villages in the hilly portion of the Kahuta Tehsil. Like the Dhund, they claim to be Abbasi Arabs.

Transport

Suzuki Carry, Jeeps are a common form of transport from Gohi and Birgran to Sehr Bagla, Taxis (for local travel)
Buses & Toyota Vans for Muzaffarabad & Rawalpindi/Islamabad
Ghilani Coach Service for Lahore & Karachi

Localities
Sozo Adventure Park,
Patriata Chair Lift,
Murree Town,
Bhurban Chair Lift,
Kohala Bridge,
Ayubia National Park,
Nathia Gali,
Islamabad City,
Rawalpindi City,
Pearl Continental (Bhurban).

References

Populated places in Murree District
Union councils of Murree Tehsil
Populated places in Murree Tehsil
Murree